Paul Bucher (1887 – 1966) was a 20th-century French egyptologist.

He worked in the Valley of the Kings where he deciphered and published inscriptions on the walls of the tombs KV34 (Thutmose III) and KV35 (Amenhotep II).

Publications 
 Les Textes des Tombes de Thoutmosis III et d'Aménophis II, MIFAO (Memoirs published by the members of the Institut Français d'Archéologie Orientale), volume 60, Cairo, 1932, 222 pages.
 Les textes à la fin des première, deuxième et troisième heures du livre "de ce qu'il y a dans la Douat". Textes comparés des tombes de Thoutmosis III, Aménophis II and Séti Ier, Institut français d'archéologie orientale, 1931, 247 pages.
 Les hymnes à Sobk-Ra, seigneur de Smenou, des papyrus n°2 and 7 de la Bibliothèque nationale de Strasbourg, P. Geuthner, 1930, 50 pages.
 with Pierre Montet, Un dieu cananéen à Tanis : Houroun de Ramsès, Numéro 2 de Revue biblique, J. Gabalda, 1935, 165 pages.
 Les Commencements des Psaumes LI to XCIII: Inscription d'une tombe de Ḳaṣr eṣ Ṣaijād

French Egyptologists
1887 births
1966 deaths
Members of the Institut Français d'Archéologie Orientale